Evening Express may refer to:

 Evening Express (Scotland), a local newspaper serving the city of Aberdeen in Scotland
 Evening Express (Portland), a defunct daily newspaper in Portland, Maine, US
 Evening Express, a program on HLN
 New York Evening Express, a defunct 19th century newspaper in New York City
 Evening Express (1849 to 1902), then the Evening Express and Evening Mail (1902–1917), defunct newspaper published in Cardiff

See also
 Express (disambiguation)